Jessica "Jess" Leigh Carter (born 27 October 1997) is an English professional footballer, who plays as a defender for Women's Super League club Chelsea FC and the England women's national team. She also holds American citizenship.

Early life
As a youth, Carter captained the Warwick Juniors to the County Cup championship. In June 2013, she joined the Birmingham City Academy.

Club career

Birmingham City
In March 2014 at the age of 16, Carter made her debut for Birmingham City in a match against Arsenal in the first leg of the 2013-14 UEFA Women's Champions League quarter-final. She was subsequently named player of the match.

Chelsea 
In June 2018, Carter joined Chelsea on a three-year contract from Birmingham City. She begun her career at Chelsea as a fringe player, starting only 11 WSL games in her first three seasons with the team. In January 2020, she scored her maiden goal for the club in a 6-1 win over Bristol City. She had her career breakout during the 2021-22 season in which she formed the key part of the defensive back three with teammates Millie Bright and Magdalena Eriksson. It was announced in October 2022 that Carter would be extending her Chelsea contract and would be remaining at the club as a defender until 2025.

International career 
Carter has represented England on the U19 and U20 national teams. During her debut for the England U19 team, she scored against Norway. In 2017, Carter was called up to the senior England squad for a qualifier against Kazakhstan and made an appearance, replacing Lucy Bronze, in the 77th minute as England won 5–0.

In June 2022 Carter was included in the England squad which won the UEFA Women's Euro 2022.

Personal life 
Carter was born in England to an American father and English mother. She is in a relationship with her Chelsea teammate Ann-Katrin Berger.

Carter is an ambassador for an all-female football academy run by former Arsenal youth player, Judan Ali.

Career statistics

Club

International
Statistics accurate as of match played 23 February 2023.

Scores and results list England's goal tally first, score column indicates score after each Carter goal.

Honours 
Chelsea
FA Women's Super League: 2019–20, 2020–21, 2021–22
Women's FA Cup: 2020–21, 2021–22
FA Women's League Cup: 2019–20, 2020–21
FA Community Shield: 2020

England

UEFA Women's Championship: 2022
Arnold Clark Cup: 2022, 2023

Individual
PFA Young Player of the Year: 2016–17
Freedom of the City of London (announced 1 August 2022)

References

External links

 Profile at uefa.com
 Profile at Chelsea FC
 

Living people
1997 births
People from Warwick
Footballers from Warwickshire
English women's footballers
English people of African-American descent
Association footballers' wives and girlfriends
Women's association football midfielders
Women's Super League players
Birmingham City W.F.C. players
Chelsea F.C. Women players
LGBT association football players
Lesbian sportswomen
English LGBT sportspeople
England women's international footballers
LGBT women
UEFA Women's Euro 2022 players
UEFA Women's Championship-winning players